Giovanni Battista Aresti de Dovara, O.P. was a Roman Catholic prelate who served as Archbishop of Aleppo (1645–1650).

Biography
Giovanni Battista Aresti de Dovara was ordained a priest in the Order of Friars Minor. On 31 July 1645, he was appointed during the papacy of Pope Innocent X as Archbishop of Aleppo. On 13 August 1645, he was consecrated bishop by Alfonso Gonzaga, Titular Archbishop of Rhodus, with Alfonso Sacrati, Bishop Emeritus of Comacchio, and Ranuccio Scotti Douglas, Bishop Emeritus of Borgo San Donnino, serving as co-consecrators. He served as Archbishop of Aleppo until his resignation in 1650.

References 

17th-century Italian Roman Catholic archbishops
Bishops appointed by Pope Innocent X